Edward "Felix" McTeigue was a Grammy Award-nominated record producer and songwriter.

Career
Notable songs by McTeigue include Platinum selling and number one Mediabase hit "Anything Goes" for the band Florida Georgia Line. In 2017 McTeigue was nominated for a Grammy award for "Wreck You", a song co-written and released by Lori McKenna.  Additionally, "Wreck You" was nominated for 2018 American Award for Americana song of the year.  McTeigue also co-wrote Dallas Smith's top five Canadian Country song "Jumped Right In" which was certified gold in 2014.

McTeigue began to produce records for other artists.  Other writers and performers he collaborated with include Mary Gauthier, Amy Helm and Katharine McPhee.

Previously a singer-songwriter himself, McTeigue released several critically acclaimed solo albums and performed at venues including The Fillmore in San Francisco, The Bottom Line in New York City and the Iron Horse Music Hall in Northampton, Massachusetts.

McTeigue died in 2020 after complications from surgery.

Family
McTeigue's mother Maggie Roche (1951–2017) formed folk/pop group The Roches with her sisters Suzzy and Terre. Singer-songwriter Lucy Wainwright Roche, Suzzy's daughter with Loudon Wainwright III, is McTeigue's cousin.

Tributes
Singer-songwriter Anaïs Mitchell wrote "On Your Way (Felix Song)" off her 2022 self-titled album about McTeigue's passing.

Discography

Solo studio albums
Felix McTeigue (album) (2001)
Radio Perfecto (album) (2004)
The New Deal (album as FDR) (2006)

FILO
Hoi Polloi (album) (1998)

Felix McTeigue & Jason Covert
Carnivora (album) (2010)

See also

 List of songwriters
 List of people from Brooklyn

References

External links 
 "Jumped Right In" lyrics
 Sami.The.Great nominated for Independent Music Awards

Year of birth missing (living people)
Place of birth missing (living people)
20th-century births
American male songwriters
Record producers from New York (state)
Musicians from Brooklyn
Songwriters from New York (state)
Writers from Brooklyn
Living people
McGarrigle-Wainwright-Roche family